Ketchem Island is a small island in south-eastern Australia. It is part of the Mutton Bird Island Group, lying close to the southern end of the south-western coast of Tasmania. It is also part of the Southwest National Park, and thus within the Tasmanian Wilderness World Heritage Site.

Flora and fauna
The islet's vegetation is dominated by pigface, Melaleuca sp. and Stipa sp.

References

Notes

Sources
 Brothers, Nigel; Pemberton, David; Pryor, Helen; & Halley, Vanessa. (2001). Tasmania’s Offshore Islands: seabirds and other natural features. Tasmanian Museum and Art Gallery: Hobart. 

Islands of Tasmania